Two different automobiles from Rover have been called the 3500 both of which are classified as Executive Cars (E):
 Rover P6, 1968–1977
 Rover SD1, 1976–1986

See also 
 Rover 3.5-Litre, 1958–1973

3500